Nayeem is a variant spelling of the name Naim, a male given name and family name.

Nayeem (actor), Bangladeshi film actor of the 1990s
Mohammad Nayeem Hasan, Bangladeshi cricketer
Nabiul Islam Nayeem, Bangladeshi cricketer
Syed Nayeemuddin, captain and later coach of the India national football team
Mohammed Nayeemuddin (died August 8, 2016), Gangster, Naxal leader, and alleged criminal

Names